Christian Darrisaw (born June 2, 1999) is an American football offensive tackle for the Minnesota Vikings of the National Football League (NFL). He played college football at Virginia Tech and was drafted by the Vikings in the first round of the 2021 NFL Draft.

Early life and college
Darrisaw was born on June 2, 1999 in Petersburg, Virginia. He attended Riverdale Baptist School in Upper Marlboro, Maryland, where he played at left tackle for their football team. He committed to play college football at Virginia Tech, the only NCAA FBS offer he received, but was assigned by the school to attend Fork Union Military Academy in Fork Union, Virginia for academic reasons.

Darrisaw rejoined Virginia Tech in 2018 and started at left tackle for the Hokies. He would later start every game during the 2019 and 2020 seasons, being named to the first-team All-ACC team in the latter.

Professional career

Following the 2020 season he declared for the 2021 NFL Draft, in which he was selected by the Minnesota Vikings in the first round, 23rd overall. On May 14, 2021, Darrisaw signed his four-year rookie contract with the Vikings. Darrisaw missed the first four games of his rookie season with a groin injury.

References

External links
Minnesota Vikings bio
Virginia Tech Hokies bio
Fork Union Blue Devils bio

1999 births
Living people
People from Upper Marlboro, Maryland
Players of American football from Maryland
Sportspeople from the Washington metropolitan area
American football offensive tackles
Virginia Tech Hokies football players
Sportspeople from Petersburg, Virginia
African-American players of American football
Minnesota Vikings players
21st-century African-American sportspeople